Leadel.net also known as Leadel, is a Jewish Media Hub that focuses on Jewish identity in the 21st century using digital and new media efforts.

History
Launched in September 2008, Leadel (also, Leadel.NET) was founded by the President of the European Jewish Congress, Moshe Kantor.  Leadel was created to provide a new-age, Web 2.0 based media portal to young Jewish professionals from around the world to connect generations, interact and find inspiration.

What began as a journalistic approach with one-on-one interviews with prominent Jews such as Natan Sharansky, Alan Dershowitz, and Bernard-Henri Lévy led to live interactive events both on site locations and on the Web to connect and inspire Diaspora communities, Jewish professionals, and Israel to each other.

Elements
The name Leadel originated from “Leadership Elements” and has active contents providing information and services to the global Jewish community.

Video spotlights
Leadel spotlights are collections of interviews, short mini series, and educational videos that show the variety of Judaism and Jewish identity in the 21st century.

Shevet Achim
Shevet Achim is a joint initiative and project between the offices of Yuli Edelstein, Israeli Minister of Diaspora Affairs, and the European Jewish Congress.

Shevet Achim provides alternative, accessible means of communication between Jewish Diaspora communities and leading Israeli government officials.  Each event uses video conferencing and Webcast technology to create bridges across geographical borders.

Leadel 7
Leadel 7 was a mini WebTV series or collection of Webisodes produced in 2009-2010 spotlighting hip Jewish topics on the Web. All Leadel 7 episodes and project were produced in conjunction with the Sammy Ofer School of Communications at The Interdisciplinary Center(IDC) located in Herzliya, Israel.

Leadel Live
Live events take place approximately every other month using Internet based Webcasting as an access and distribution tool for interaction. Content discusses current media issues and topics ranging from Israeli media to Iran to Jewish perspective.

Leadel EDU
Leadel EDU is a platform that provides Jewish educational content for teachers and educators to enrich programming about Jewish identity and Israel in the 21st century.

Leadel Blog
The Leadel Blog is ongoing written coverage of global Jewish events, ideas and Web happenings.

Funding
Leadel is a project of the European Jewish Congress and funded by the European Jewish Fund(EJF).

References

External links 
 

Jewish websites
Jews and Judaism in Europe
Jews and Judaism in the United States
Internet properties established in 2008